John Emerson (June 4, 1859 – July 25, 1932) was the 15th mayor of Calgary, Alberta. He was the mayor at the time that Alberta became a province of Canada, which was on September 1, 1905.

Born in England, Emerson emigrated to Calgary in 1885 and began farming on a homestead just outside the city limits. Soon he left farming and established a successful grocery business on Stephen Avenue.

After spending three years on Calgary City Council, Emerson spent two years as mayor from January 2, 1905 to January 14, 1907. During his tenure as mayor, Calgary hosted a number of prominent visitors. This included: The Prince of Wales (later George V), Prince Arthur of Connaught, and several Governors General. Emerson would lead the unsuccessful Calgary delegation to Ottawa on February 2, 1905 to lobby for Calgary to be named the capital of the new province of Alberta. Emerson would be joined by Major James Walker, William Henry Cushing, and W. M. Davidson.

Emerson retired to Burgess Hill, Sussex, England. He died there in 1932.

References 

1859 births
1932 deaths
Mayors of Calgary
Calgary city councillors
20th-century Canadian politicians